The Dvoinoye Gold Mine is an underground gold mine in the Bilibinsky District of the Chukotka Autonomous Okrug of Russia. Originally the site of a surface mine, Kinross acquired the property in 2010, and built the underground mine at a cost of US$360-million. The mine began production in 2013.

History
The property was purchased from Northern Gold; an open pit mine previously operated on the site, producing 250 tonnes per day, six months per year. After acquisition, Kinross completed diamond drilling on the property, and a feasibility study. Production began at the mine in October 2013, and the mine was built "on time and on budget" at a cost of US$360-million.

Operation
The Dvoinoye mine is expected to operate at the rate of 1000 tonnes of ore per day, which will be processed at Kupol, producing a gold and silver doré. To handle the additional ore from Dvoinoye, capacity at the mineral processing facility at Kupol was increased by an additional 1000 tonnes per day, yielding a total capacity of 4,500 tonnes per day.

Reserves and resources
The Dvoinoye Gold Mine has a NI 43-101 proven and probable reserves of more than two million tonnes of gold ore, at a grade of approximately 19 grams per tonne gold and 28.5 grams per tonne silver. There is an additional 280,000 tonnes in the measured, indicated, and inferred categories, although at a lower grade.

References

Gold mines in Russia
Economy of Chukotka Autonomous Okrug
Kinross Gold
Surface mines in Russia
Underground mines in Russia